The Roman Catholic Diocese of Lira is a diocese located in the city of Lira in the Ecclesiastical province of Gulu in Uganda.

History
 July 12, 1968: Established as Diocese of Lira from Diocese of Gulu

Ordinaries
 Cesare Asili (1968.07.12 – 1988.10.12)
 Joseph Oyanga (1989.07.04 – 2003.12.02)
 Giuseppe Franzelli, M.C.C.I. (2005.04.01 – 2018.11.23)
 Sanctus Lino Wanok (2018.11.23 -)

See also
Roman Catholicism in Uganda
Lira

References

External links
 GCatholic.org
 Catholic Hierarchy

Roman Catholic dioceses in Uganda
Christian organizations established in 1968
Roman Catholic dioceses and prelatures established in the 20th century
Lira District
1968 establishments in Uganda
Roman Catholic Ecclesiastical Province of Gulu